Namdulu hala is one of the clans of the Manchu nobility descending from the modern day Ussuriysk. The clan inhabited the Changbai mountains, Huichun valley, Jihe, Warka and Hada. When Namdulu clan was on the verge of extinction, most of the descendants of Hada Nara clan were adopted into the Hada kin. After the demise of the Qing dynasty, modern day descendants of the Namdulu clan changed their surnames into Na (那), Nan (南), Fu (傅) and Shen (沈)

Notable figures

Males 

 Kangwuli (康武理) served as one of the 16 ministers of Nurhaci
 Laita (赖塔), a defector of the rebellion of Li Zicheng and first class duke Baoji (一等褒绩公)
 Yuehai (岳海), fourth rank literary official
 Yong'an (永安), served as second rank military official.
 Shishun (侍顺), third class baron
 Enpu (恩扑)
 Wenxi (文熙)，adopted by his uncle Enchong
 Xianfu (县富)

References 

Manchu clans
People from Ussuriysk